The Bridge House Estates is a charitable trust, originating in the late eleventh century and formally established by royal charter in 1282 by the City of London Corporation in London, England. It was originally established to maintain London Bridge and, subsequently, other bridges. Funded by bridge tolls and charitable donations, the trust acquired an extensive property portfolio which made it more than self-sufficient. As well as maintaining the bridges, the estates also makes other charitable grants through the  City Bridge Trust, their grant-making arm. It is one of three funds managed by the City of London, the other two being the City Fund and the City's Cash.

Since it was established, the trust has maintained, and on several occasions replaced, London Bridge. The trust also built Blackfriars Bridge and Tower Bridge, and purchased Southwark Bridge from the toll-exacting private company that built it. Most recently it took over ownership and maintenance of the pedestrian-only Millennium Bridge, having provided a large amount of the funding for its construction.  The estate owns significant amounts of property in the City of London, including the Old Bailey.

Until 1995, the trust was permitted to use its income only for expenditure on its bridges. However, with a surplus of income over expenditure, a cy-près scheme was adopted in that year to allow any surplus income to be used for other charitable purposes benefiting Greater London. These grants are made through the City Bridge Trust.

Bridge House
The trust took its name from Bridge House, which was the administrative and maintenance centre of Old London Bridge located on the south bank of the River Thames, near the site of St Olave's Church (since replaced by St Olaf House in Tooley Street). The site, now covered by the London Bridge Hospital and the Cotton's Centre, was constituted of at least two properties in Southwark. The first was that of Peter of Colechurch the warden of the bridge from 1163, and probably a monastic dwelling. The second property was the house left by will of Henry Fitz Ailwyn, first named Mayor of London, in 1215.

The bridge became part of the City's jurisdiction from 1282, and this led to the City attempting to extend control over Southwark, succeeding in acquiring the 'vill of Southwark' alias the Guildable Manor in 1327.

Logo

Known as the Bridge Mark, the logo of Bridge House Estates is one of the oldest logos in continuous use and can be found carved into stonework in many places along the riverfront. It has been the identifying emblem of the Bridge House Estates for many centuries, but the latter now uses the City of London arms as an emblem. The City Bridge Trust uses the mark as a logo.

It was thought likely that the mark as we know it today was designed by a famous 17th-century surveyor, William Leybourn. It appears drawn on a plan of 1680 which it is thought he adapted from a similar mark drawn against plots owned by Bridge House Estates on an earlier plan of St George's Fields in Southwark. The City sword rest from the church of St Olave, Southwark (now in the north transept of Southwark Cathedral) has the Bridge Mark carved onto it to balance the City's shield, and shows a date of 1674.

Governance
The trust was established by the grant of a royal charter on 24 May 1282, and the sole trustee is the City of London Corporation. The trustee is the legal but not beneficial owner of the trust property—it may only be used for the legitimate purposes for which the fund was created.

Bridge House Estates and its grantmaking arm (the City Bridge Trust) are run by a committee of the City of London Corporation called the Bridge House Estates Board, the chairmanship of which is held by a Common Councilman on a three-year rotation.  the current Chair is Giles Shilson.

In addition to its royal charter of 1282, the Bridge House Estates operates with respect to various legislative powers e.g. the Blackfriars Bridge Act 1863, the Blackfriars and Southwark Bridge Act 1867, the Corporation of London (Tower Bridge) Act 1885 for its maintenance role and for its general charitable role under the Charities (The Bridge House Estates) Order 1995 (Statutory Instrument 1047), and the Charities (The Bridge House Estates) Order 2001 (Statutory Instrument 4017).

Finances
Originally funded by tolls on London Bridge, the rents and leases of the buildings that were on it and also by charitable donations, the Bridge House Estates acquired an extensive property portfolio which made it self-sufficient.

The fund administered by the Bridge House Estates is solely responsible for the five City Bridges. There is no financial support from the government or any other fund. If one of the bridges happened to collapse, the charity would have to rebuild it out of the endowment. The good stewardship of the property and investments of the estates by the City has led to the accumulation of surplus funds over any such demand on its resources. Therefore, the City sought from the Charity Commission to implement a cy-près scheme to extend its objects (purposes) since September 1995 to make charitable grants within the Greater London area.

In 2019, total income of the Bridge House Estates was £43.1 million and total expenditure and reinvestment was £53.1 million. The total funds held by the estates are in excess of £1.5 billion.

References

External links
 City Bridge Trust
 

1282 establishments in England
Charitable trusts
Charities based in London
Finances of the City of London
Foundations based in the United Kingdom
Organisations based in the City of London